Ruff 'N' Tuff is the ninth studio album by Beenie Man.

Track listing
"Matie" – 3:49
"Black Liberty" – 3:35
"Gi Man Bun" – 3:48
"Mouth Murderer" – 3:40
"Good Times" – 4:10
"Rough & Tough, Beenie Man"– 3:47
"Young Man Got the John" – 3:51
"Push Up Your Hands" – 3:34
"Three Against War" – 4:07
"Bicycle Man" – 3:30
"Mankind" – 3:43
"Miss Brown & Pretty" – 3:33
"Promises" – 3:27
"Miss Angela" – 4:13
"She's Running from Her Life" – 3:36
"Do the Butterfly" – 3:21

Charts

References

Beenie Man albums
1999 albums